Puffing Billy is the world's oldest surviving steam locomotive, constructed in 1813–1814 by colliery viewer William Hedley, enginewright Jonathan Forster and blacksmith Timothy Hackworth for Christopher Blackett, the owner of Wylam Colliery near Newcastle upon Tyne, in the United Kingdom. It was employed to haul coal chaldron wagons from the mine at Wylam to the docks at Lemington in Northumberland.

History

Precursors 
In 1810 the Durham Coalfield was disrupted by a major strike over the Bond system. During this time Christopher Blackett, owner of the Wylam Colliery, took advantage of the pit's idleness to experiment with the idea of a locomotive-hauled tramway worked purely by adhesion, rather than the Blenkinsop rack system used on the Middleton. These began with a simple hand-cranked wagon, converted from a coal wagon chassis with the addition of a central drive shaft and geared drives to the axles.

As this experiment was successful, by 1812 it was followed by Wylam's first prototype 'travelling engine', worked by steam. This was based on a combination of the test wagon, with a single cylinder engine and boiler atop it. Little is known of the design, although it has been said to have been inspired by Trevithick's Pen-y-darren locomotive. It is unclear whether the single cylinder was vertical or horizontal, and whether the boiler had a single straight flue or a return flue. It may have been nicknamed Grasshopper. The 'travelling engine' was successful as a prototype, but underpowered and prone to stalling when overloaded or faced by a gradient. It was however convincing enough as a demonstration to encourage Blackett to fund further locomotives.

Prototypes 
Puffing Billy was one of three similar engines built by Hedley, the resident engineer at Wylam Colliery, to replace the horses used as motive power on the tramway. In 1813, Hedley built for Blackett's colliery business on the Wylam Colliery line the prototypes, Puffing Billy and Wylam Dilly. They were both rebuilt in 1815 with ten wheels, but were returned to their original condition in 1830 when the railway was relaid with stronger rails.

In the September 1814 edition of Annals of Philosophy two locomotives with rack wheels are mentioned (probably Salamanca and Blücher), then there is mention of "another steam locomotive at Newcastle, employed for a similar purpose [hauling coals], and moving along without any rack wheel, simply by its friction against the rail road".  From the context, this is at a different location to Blücher, so is probably Puffing Billy.

Puffing Billy remained in service until 1862, when Edward Blackett, the owner of Wylam Colliery, lent it to the Patent Office Museum in South Kensington, London (later the Science Museum). He later sold it to the museum for £200. It is still on display there. Its sister locomotive, Wylam Dilly, is preserved in the National Museum of Scotland in Edinburgh.

Two replicas exist: one, built in a Royal Bavarian State Railways workshop in 1906, is at the German Museum, Munich; the other, at Beamish Museum, was first run in 2006.

Design 
Puffing Billy incorporated a number of novel features, patented by Hedley, which were to prove important to the development of locomotives. It had two vertical cylinders, one on either side of the boiler, and partly enclosed by it, and drove a single crankshaft beneath the frames, from which gears drove and also coupled the wheels allowing better traction.

The engine had a number of serious technical limitations. Running on cast-iron wagonway plates, its eight-ton weight was too heavy and broke them, encouraging opponents of locomotive traction to criticise the innovation. This problem was alleviated by redesigning the engine with four axles so that the weight was spread more evenly. The engine was eventually rebuilt as a four-wheeler when improved edge rails track was introduced around 1830. It was not particularly fast, being capable of no more than 5 mph (8 km/h).

Legacy 
Puffing Billy was an important influence on George Stephenson, who lived locally, and its success was a key factor in promoting the use of steam locomotives by other collieries in north-eastern England.

It has been suggested that Puffing Billy'''s name survives in the English language in the intensifier like billy-o, but there are several alternative explanations for that phrase's origin.

In 1952, British light music composer Edward White wrote a melody named after the locomotive. The piece became ubiquitous in British media, being used on BBC Light Programme's Children's Favourites, a radio request programme, from 1952 to 1966, and also appearing in numerous commercials and radio shows.  The piece also became extremely popular in the United States, where it served as the theme for Captain Kangaroo'' from 1955 to 1974.

References

Further reading
 

Individual locomotives of Great Britain
English inventions
Steam engines in the Science Museum, London
Early steam locomotives
Preserved steam locomotives of Great Britain
0-8-0 locomotives
5 ft gauge locomotives